A comma code is a type of prefix-free code in which a comma, a particular symbol or sequence of symbols, occurs at the end of a code word and never occurs otherwise. This is an intuitive way to express arrays.

For example, Fibonacci coding is a comma code in which the comma is 11.  11 and 1011 are valid Fibonacci code words, but 101, 0111, and 11011 are not.

Examples 

 Unary coding, in which the comma is 0. This allows NULL values ( when the code and comma is a single 0, the value can be taken as a NULL or a 0 ).
 Fibonacci coding, in which the comma is 11.
 All Huffman codes can be converted to comma codes by prepending a 1 to the entire code and using a single 0 as a code and the comma. 

The definition of word being a number of symbols ending in a comma, the equivalent of a space character.
 50% commas in all data axiom - All implied data specifically variable length bijective data can be shown to be consisting of exactly 50% of commas.

All data or suitably curated same-length data exhibits so called implied probability. Scrambled data that cannot be distinguished from maximum entropy or random data exhibits known and observable statistical probabilities whilst trying to read the scrambled data. Ideally no prior knowledge except for the observable fact that the data is high entropy data. Similar to the concept of 'code space' as demonstrated by Chen-Ho encoding. 

Such data can be termed 'generic data' can be analysed using any interleaving unary code as headers where additional bijective bits ( equal to the length of the unary code just read ) are read as data while the unary code serves as an introduction or header for the data. This header serves as a comma. The data can be read in an interleaving fashion between each bit of the header or in post read fashion when the data is only read after the entire unary header code is read like Chen-Ho encoding. 

It can be seen by random walk techniques and by statistical summation that all generic data has a header or comma of an average of 2 bits and data of an additional 2 bits ( minimum 1 ).

This also allows for an inexpensive base increase algorithm before transmission in non binary communication channels, like base-3 or base-5 communication channels.

Where '?' is '1' or '2' for the value of the bijective digit that requires no further processing.

Of course we use a single comma to separate each field of data, therefore showing that all the data consists of 50% of commas. This is quite visible from an implied probability of 50% for the 0 code in Huffman base 3 codes: 0,10,11 ( net 2/3 or 66.66% commas ) or the base-5 comma code shown above. The cost-per-character quotient of higher base communication has to maintain near logarithmic values for the data and less than 2-bits for the comma character to maintain cost effectiveness. 

This method has an assurance of a '1' or '2' after every '0' ( comma ) and this property can be useful when designing around timing concerns in transmission. It can be somewhat expensive to convert a known binary value to ternary unless ternary bit costs are reduced to similar to binary bit costs, so this bit can be multiplexed in a separate binary channel if costs agree ( this may require a read of an additional 'tail'/trailing portion of 2-bits pure data for the binary channel ( from after the first bit of the first change as this is not an instantly-decodable code, simply read if using an instantly decodable unary code ) to be similar to the 2 average ternary bits remaining on the primary channel equivalent to  bits before cost comparisons are factored in ). 

Not considering multiplexing, this method has a read efficiency of 3 ternary digits for a read of 4 binary bits or 1.33 bits. Or  

 66.66% ( 2/3 ) commas in all data axiom - All implied data specifically variable length data can be shown to be consisting of exactly 66.66% ( 2/3 ) of commas.

Where '?' is '1' or '2' for the value of the bijective digit that requires no further processing. This method results in statistical similarity to a simple 'implied read' of Huffman base 3 codes: 0,10,11 ( net 2/3 or 66.66% commas ).

It can be seen by random walk techniques and by statistical summation that all generic data has a header or comma of an average of 2 bits and data of an additional 1 bit ( minimum 0 ) .

This has no assurance of a '1' or '2' after every '0' ( comma ) a property that can be useful when designing around timing concerns in transmission.

This method has a read efficiency of 2 ternary digits for a read of 3 binary bits or 1.5 binary bits/ternary digit. Or 

 34.375% | 31.25% ( ~ 1/3 ) write commas for efficiency gains using number partitioning - Implied reads and writes using number partitioning techniques ( 'm' numbers divided into 'n' partitions result in n^m permutations ) similar to Chen-Ho and Hertz encoding show greater efficiency of both reads and writes similar to nearly random distribution. Thus the use of codes makes less sense and the use of higher bases becomes more important. Similarly, a 'write' comma becomes any number in the base, a 'read' comma is the header shown below, Huffman base 4 codes: 0,10,110,111. 
The main advantage to this technique apart from higher efficiency is that there is no base conversion required which would require the entire stream to be read first and then converted. The disadvantage is that the average number length becomes higher and similar to random number generation and timing concerns that govern ternary transmission come to the fore. With m=2 and n=2, we get, not forgetting that a value of '(2)' is essentially 0-bits:

This method therefore has a read efficiency of 2 ternary digits for a read of  binary bits or 1.5625 binary bits/ternary digit. Or  . 

A write efficiency of 2 ternary digits for a write of  bits or 1.61 binary bits/ternary digit, or 

This works because  and ≃ . This of course is more of a theoretical construct and has no mention about timing when trying to apply this to ternary transmission methods. It does however leave  codes to design around timing concerns.

See also 

 Self-synchronizing code

References 

Coding theory